Nicolò Gagliano (active. c. 1730s – 1787 in Naples), although there is some discussion about the exact dates)  (also known as Nicolo, Nicola or Nicolaus  Gagliano - also sometimes known as Nicolò I, to differentiate him from Nicolò II, his grandson), was an Italian violin-maker, the eldest son of Alessandro Gagliano. He made many admirable instruments, often imitated.  Some have been mistaken for those of Stradivari. Nicolò was a more prolific maker than his brother Gennaro (Januarius). Nicolò and Gennaro are considered the greatest luthiers in the Gagliano family and the pinnacle of Neapolitan violin-making. Although Nicolò's work is not always entirely consistent in quality, it often shows great distinction. His instruments have bold and well-proportioned archings, with the instrument scrolls having a distinctive elongated pegbox and small tight spiral. He often placed a small label with a religious dedication inside his  instruments.

Nicolò Gagliano had four sons, all makers — Ferdinando, Giuseppe (Joseph), Antonio, and Giovanni. Giuseppe's three sons Raffaele, Antonio and Nicolò (II) were also violin makers and carried the family's violin-making tradition into the middle of the 19th century.

Typical labels:
Nicolaii Gagliano fecit
in Napoli 1711

Nicolaus Gagliano filius
Alexandri fecit Neap. 1732

See also
 Gagliano family

References

External links
Bibliography
" Nicola Gagliano Violin" by the John Dilworth on the Amati website.
Violin by Nicola Gagliano, Naples, 1762"

Article based on a text prepared by the Smithsonian Institution 

Year of birth uncertain
1780 deaths
Italian musical instrument makers
18th-century Italian people